Che with descender and dot below (Ҷ̣ ҷ̣; italics: Ҷ̣ ҷ̣) is a letter of the Cyrillic script. 

It is only used in the Wakhi language where it represents the voiced retroflex affricate .